Zabein Muhaji Mhita (born 9 September 1950) is a Tanzanian CCM politician and Member of Parliament for Kondoa North constituency since 2005.

References

1950 births
Living people
Chama Cha Mapinduzi MPs
Tanzanian MPs 2005–2010
Tanzanian MPs 2010–2015
Dodoma Secondary School alumni
Msalato Secondary School alumni
University of Dar es Salaam alumni